Twisted Forever – A Tribute to the Legendary Twisted Sister is a tribute album to Twisted Sister, released in 2001. Release of the album was on both CD, and a collector's  edition released on double pink vinyl records.

Track listing / Artist 
I Wanna Rock  /  Lit
Shoot 'Em Down / Motörhead
The Kids Are Back  /  Nashville Pussy
The Price /  Nine Days
Wake Up the Sleeping Giant / Chuck D
Destroyer  /  Anthrax
Under the Blade / Overkill
The Fire Still Burns / Cradle of Filth
Don't Let Me Down /  Vision of Disorder
Burn in Hell /  The Step Kings
Ride to Live (Live to Ride)  / Fu Manchu
We're Not Gonna Take It /   Joan Jett
You Can't Stop Rock 'N Roll  / Sebastian Bach & Friends
We're Gonna Make It / HammerFall
I Am (I'm Me) / Sevendust
Sin City /  Twisted Sister

Charts
Album

References

2001 compilation albums
Heavy metal compilation albums
Tribute albums